The Swazi Honours System consists of orders and medals awarded for exemplary service to the nation.

Civilian

Military

Eswatini and the Commonwealth of Nations